Haringey Borough may refer to:

 London Borough of Haringey
 Haringey Borough F.C., a London football club